Bertrand Lagros de Langeron, known professionally as So Me, is a French graphic designer, animator, director and music producer. He is the art director for Ed Banger Records and also releases his own tracks on that label.

He has created videos for DJ Mehdi, Kanye West, Kid Cudi, Justice, and MGMT. He won the 2005 MTV European award for his video for the Justice vs. Simian song "We Are Your Friends". He is also the main designer for the clothing company Club 75. In 2010 Bertrand directed the music video for Duck Sauce's song "Barbra Streisand" and also makes a cameo in the video. In 2011, de Langeron joined the Los Angeles agency Caviar, which also represents the directors Alexander Payne, Ruben Fleischer, and Peter Farrelly.

In 2011, he directed the music video for the Ed Banger artist SebastiAn's song "Embody".
He is also responsible for a poster that comes with the CD of Audio, Video, Disco by Justice

In 2021, he directed and wrote one of the six episodes of the Canal+ miniseries, 6 X Confiné.e.s. This is the episode "Scorpex", in which Vincent Cassel plays the main role. Cassel plays a DJ named Scorpex. So Me drew on his personal experience at Ed Banger Records to design this episode.

References

French animators
French animated film directors
French graphic designers
Living people
1979 births